Lithothelium grossum is a species of corticolous (bark-dwelling) lichen in the family Pyrenulaceae. Found in China, it was formally described as a new species in 2006 by Dutch lichenologist André Aptroot. Lithothelium grossum is characterized by its large hyaline (translucent) ascospores, which measure 27–37 by 12–17 μm; these are the largest of hyaline-spored species in genus Lithothelium.

References

Eurotiomycetes
Lichen species
Lichens described in 2006
Lichens of China
Taxa named by André Aptroot